Ahad Rafidah is a province in southern Saudi Arabia in the 'Asir Region. The number of its affiliated villages is 144 villages, and its population is close to one hundred thousand people. The majority of citizens in this city are from the Qahtani tribe.

Location 
Together with Khamis Mushait and Abha, Ahad Rafidah is centrally located in Wadi Bisha. It is 15 km southeast from Khamis Mushait and about 30 km east of Abha. Ahad Rafidah is located on the national road 15. It is about 100 km southwest from the Red Sea and 110 km north of the Yemeni border.

References 

Populated places in 'Asir Province